Club Social Deportivo y Cultural Atlético y Progreso (simply known as Atlético y Progreso) is an Argentine sports club, located in the city of Brandsen of Buenos Aires Province. The football team plays in the regional "Liga Chascomunense de Fútbol" ("Chascomús Football League") while the rugby union squad participates in Primera C, the fourth division of the URBA league system. The club also has field hockey teams competing in Cuenca del Salado league.

Apart of the aforementioned sections, Atlético y Progreso also hosts the practise of other sports such as basketball, martial arts and roller skating. By 2013 the club had about 1,300 active members.

History
Atlético y Progreso was established on August 20, 1967, from the merger of both institutions, Club Atlético and Club Progreso of Brandsen. The club has about 2,400 active members.

One of Atlético y Progreso's most notable athletes was footballer Sebastián Saja, a Brandsen native who started playing football at the club when he was only 5 years old. Saja then developed a long career in some of the most notable Primera División clubs such as San Lorenzo and Racing among others, and even the Argentina national team.

References

External links
 Official Facebook
 Football team news on El Suplente
 Official Twitter (rugby only)

Rugby clubs established in 1967
A
a
1967 establishments in Argentina